"This Side" was the first single by the progressive bluegrass band Nickel Creek from their second album, This Side. Sean Watkins takes vocal duties for "This Side".

The song was written by Sean Watkins. It is one of three songs recorded by Nickel Creek that were written single-handedly by Sean, the other two being "Somebody More Like You" on Why Should the Fire Die?, and "Speak". The single peaked at #56 on the U.S. Billboard Hot Country Singles & Tracks chart.

Synopsis
"This Side" is about going through a transition to a different lifestyle, being scared at first, but then feeling comfortable with the change. The narrator sings "it's foreign on this side, and I'll not leave my home again". Later, he changes his mind, by singing "it's foreign on this side, and it feels like I'm home again".

Chart performance

Personnel
Sean Watkins - guitar, lead vocals
Sara Watkins - fiddle, harmony vocals
Chris Thile - mandolin, harmony vocals
Byron House - acoustic bass

External links
Music video at the CMT website

References

Nickel Creek songs
2003 singles
Songs written by Sean Watkins
2002 songs